Pristurus minimus, also known as Arnold's rock gecko or least semaphore gecko, is a species of lizard in the Sphaerodactylidae family found in Oman, the United Arab Emirates, and Yemen.

References

Pristurus
Reptiles described in 1977